The 2008 Paradise Jam was an early-season men's and women's college basketball tournament. The tournament, which began in 2000, was part of the 2008–09 NCAA Division I men's basketball season and 2008-09 NCAA Division I women's basketball season.  The tournament was played at the Sports and Fitness Center in Saint Thomas, U.S. Virgin Islands. Connecticut won the men's tournament, in the women's tournament Wisconsin won Island Division, and California won the women's Reef Division.

Men's tournament

In the first round, Wisconsin took on unranked Iona, and won, but by only two points 60–58. Miami faced unranked Southern Miss and won by ten, 70–50. Connecticut played LaSalle and Connecticut won 89–81; with A.J. Price returning to play after an ankle injury, but still suffering from an abscessed tooth.

In the second round, Connecticut faced Miami, but won by 13 points, 76–63. Wisconsin faced San Diego, the winner of the first round game against Valparaiso, and won 64–49. In the championship game UConn faced Wisconsin, but opened up a ten-point lead by halftime, and extended it to a 19-point victory at the end of the game, with a final score of 76–57. Jerome Dyson was the leading scorer for Connecticut, while Hasheem Thabeet earned the Tournament MVP honors.

Bracket

Women's tournament
The woman's tournament is organized as two divisions of four teams, each playing each other in a round-robin format.

Island Division
In the opening round, Wisconsin beat Villanova by two points 47–45, while 7th ranked Baylor beat UCF 79–67. In the second round, Wisconsin improved to 2–0 with a 65–61 victory over UCF, as well as Baylor who beat Villanova 62–57. Baylor had a 21–2 run early in the game to take a large lead, and the Bears still held a 16-point lead at halftime. The Wildcats cut the lead to three with just over two minutes left in the game, but Baylor hit five of six free throws to hold on to the victory 52–57.

On the final day, Villanova beat UCF to finish in third place. In the championship game, the two undefeated teams faced each other. Unranked Wisconsin was down by six points at halftime, and Baylor still lead by five points with under three minutes to go when Wisconsin scored six straight points to take the lead, ending with a two-point jump shot with seven seconds left in the game by Alyssa Karel. Baylor had one last shot; Melissa Jones was fouled at the buzzer, but missed both free throws to secure the Paradise Jam Championship (Island) for Wisconsin. Wisconsin's Alyssa Karel won the tournament MVP award.

Reef Division

In the first round Iowa played Texas Tech. The halftime margin was two points in favor of Iowa, and they extended the lead to win the game 56–48. In the other game 3rd ranked California took on South Florida and won easily, 85–55. In the second round South Florida took Iowa to overtime, then won 82–79 in overtime. California played Texas Tech and won 68–54.  On the final day, South Florida beat Texas Tech to earn second place in the division with a 2–1 record. California easily beat Iowa 76–43 to go undefeated and win the 2008 Paradise Jam Championship (Reef) California's Ashley Walker won the Tournament MVP.

References

Paradise Jam Tournament
Paradise Jam
Paradise Jam